Julia Kathleen Nancy McKenzie  (born 17 February 1941) is an English actress, singer, presenter, and theatre director. She has premièred leading roles written by both Alan Ayckbourn and Stephen Sondheim. On television, she is known for her BAFTA Award nominated role as Hester Fields in the sitcom Fresh Fields (1984–1986) and its sequel French Fields (1989–1991), and as Miss Marple in Agatha Christie's Marple (2009–2013).

McKenzie has also starred in numerous musicals, receiving a 1977 Tony Award nomination for her work in the Broadway revue, Side by Side by Sondheim. A six-time Olivier Award nominee, she has twice won the Olivier Award for Best Actress in a Musical; for the 1982 revival of Guys and Dolls and the 1993 revival of Stephen Sondheim's Sweeney Todd: The Demon Barber of Fleet Street. She also starred in the original London productions of the Sondheim musicals Follies (1987) and Into the Woods (1990). Her film appearances include Bright Young Things (2003) and Notes on a Scandal (2006).

Early life
McKenzie was born on 17 February 1941, in Enfield, Middlesex, England, the daughter of Kathleen Rowe and Albion McKenzie. She attended Woodside High School.

She trained at the Guildhall School of Music and Drama.

Career

Theatre
McKenzie's early West End musical credits include Maggie May (1966), Mame (1969), and Company (1971). She appeared in the West End revue Side by Side by Sondheim in 1976, and made her Broadway debut when the show transferred to New York in 1977, receiving a Tony Award nomination for Best Featured Actress in a Musical. She also received a Drama Desk Award nomination. For her role as Miss Adelaide in the 1982 West End revival of Guys and Dolls, she won the first of two Olivier Awards for Best Actress in a Musical.

For her role in the 1986 West End production of the Alan Ayckbourn play Woman in Mind, McKenzie won the Evening Standard Award for Best Actress. She went on to appear in the original West End productions of two Sondheim musicals, playing Sally in Follies at the Shaftesbury Theatre in 1987, and the Witch in Into the Woods at the Phoenix Theatre in 1990. She continued her association with Stephen Sondheim when she starred as Mrs Lovett in the 1993 London revival of Sweeney Todd: The Demon Barber of Fleet Street. The role won her a second Olivier Award in 1994.

McKenzie appeared in a National Theatre 80th birthday tribute to Lord Olivier, Happy Birthday, Sir Larry, on 31 May 1987 in the presence of Olivier himself.

Film and television
McKenzie’s early television credits include the sitcom Maggie and Her (1978–1979), alongside Irene Handl and That Beryl Marston...! (1981), with Gareth Hunt. She went on to greater popularity with British viewers as Hester in the 1980s sitcom Fresh Fields opposite Anton Rodgers, and its 1990s sequel French Fields, for which she was voted TV Times Favourite Female Comedy Performance for five consecutive years. The role also earned her a 1985 BAFTA nomination for Best Entertainment Performance. She appeared as Mrs Forthby in Blott on the Landscape and as a villager involved in a series of murders in an episode of Midsomer Murders. Film credits include Hotel du Lac (1986), Shirley Valentine (1989), Bright Young Things (2003), These Foolish Things (2006) and Notes on a Scandal (2006). She has also made several appearances in BBC TV's long running variety show, The Good Old Days.

She was the subject of This Is Your Life in 1981 when she was surprised by Eamonn Andrews outside the Royalty Theatre in London.

In 2007, she was reunited with Anton Rodgers (again as a husband and wife team) in the ITV comedy You Can Choose Your Friends. Also in 2007, she co-starred with Michael Gambon and Judi Dench in the BBC One costume drama series Cranford, playing Mrs. Forrester, a military widow of slender means, very attached to her cow Bessie.

In 2008, she was announced as the replacement for Geraldine McEwan as ITV's Miss Marple. She noted: "It’s difficult because Agatha Christie wrote her in two ways ... First, very much what Geraldine McEwan played: a slight, rather Victorian creature. Then, a little sturdier and tweedier. I chose the latter. A lot of people say they don’t like the tweedier version. But they’re both genuine." Also, she said: "Just about everybody in the world knows about Miss Marple and has an opinion of what she should be like, so I’m under no illusions about the size of the task ahead." McKenzie's first series of Marple comprised A Pocket Full of Rye, Murder Is Easy, They Do It with Mirrors and Why Didn't They Ask Evans?. The second series of the show, which aired in 2010, included The Pale Horse, The Secret of Chimneys, The Blue Geranium, and The Mirror Crack'd from Side to Side. A sixth series, including adaptations of A Caribbean Mystery, Greenshaw's Folly and Endless Night, began filming in September 2012 and was broadcast in 2013.

During 2012, she also played the role of Betty Nicholas in the ITV television series The Town.

On 26 December 2013, McKenzie appeared as the title character in the film adaption of David Walliams' book Gangsta Granny. In February 2015, McKenzie appeared as Shirley Mollison in the BBC mini series The Casual Vacancy.

Other work
She is a radio performer with a long list of credits, including Blithe Spirit, The Country Wife and A Room with a View. As a director she has staged Stepping Out, Peter Pan, Hey, Mr. Producer!, Steel Magnolias, Putting It Together and A Little Night Music.

Throughout the early mid 2000s she played Ariadne Oliver in radio adaptations of Agatha Christie novels starring John Moffatt as Hercule Poirot; one such novel was Elephants Can Remember.

She also recorded an audio book of Lewis Carroll's Through the Looking Glass.

McKenzie also lent her voice to several animated works for Martin Gates Productions including three films The Snow Queen, Jack and the Beanstalk and The Snow Queen's Revenge and the TV series Bimble's Bucket.

In 2018, McKenzie was cast as The Twelve in a Big Finish production The Eighth Doctor – Time War 2.

Personal life
In 1971 McKenzie married American actor-director Jerry Harte. He died in 2018.

McKenzie is a critic of fox hunting and was among more than 20 high-profile people who signed a letter to members of parliament in 2015 to oppose Conservative Prime Minister David Cameron's plan to amend the Hunting Act 2004.

McKenzie was appointed a Commander of the Order of the British Empire (CBE) in the 2018 New Year Honours for services to drama.

Credits

Stage

Acting
(London debut) Maggie May, Adelphi Theatre, 1966
Gloria, Mame, Drury Lane Theatre, London, 1969
Girl in owl coat, Promises, Promises, Prince of Wales Theatre, London, 1970
April, Company, Her Majesty's Theatre, London, 1971
Cowardy Custard, Mermaid Theatre, London, 1973
Cole, Mermaid Theatre, 1974
 Side by Side by Sondheim, Music Box Theatre, New York City (New York debut), 1977
The Norman Conquests, 1978
Ten Times Table, 1979
Miriam Dervish, Outside Edge, Queen's Theatre, 1979
Lily, On the Twentieth Century, Her Majesty's Theatre, 1980
Maggie Hobson, Hobson's Choice, Lyric Hammersmith Theatre, London, 1981
Anna Kopecka, Schweik in the Second World War, Olivier/National Theatre, London, 1982
Miss Adelaide, Guys and Dolls, Olivier/National Theatre, 1982
Susan, Woman in Mind, Vaudeville Theatre, London, 1986
Sally Plummer, Follies, Shaftesbury Theatre, London, then West End Theatre, New York City, 1987
Happy Birthday, Sir Larry, Olivier Theatre, National Theatre, 31 May 1987
Witch, Into the Woods, Phoenix Theatre, London, 1990
Mrs Lovett, Sweeney Todd: The Demon Barber of Fleet Street, National Theatre, London, 1993
Ruella, Communicating Doors, The Gielgud Theatre, London, 1995
Kafka's Dick, Piccadilly Theatre, 1998
The Royal Family, Haymarket Theatre, 2001
Fuddy Meers, Arts Theatre, 2004
The Philadelphia Story, Old Vic, 2005
 Stephen Sondheim's Old Friends, Sondheim Theatre, London, 2022

Directing
Stepping Out, Duke of York's Theatre, London, 1984
Just So, Watermill Theatre, Bagnor, Berkshire, England, 1989
Steel Magnolias, Lyric Theatre, London, 1989
Putting It Together, Manhattan Theatre Club Stage I, New York City, 1993
 Hey, Mr. Producer! The Musical World of Cameron Mackintosh (stage direction, with Bob Avian), Lyceum Theatre, London, 1998
A Little Night Music, Tokyo, 1999

Filmography

Feature films

Awards and nominations

See also

List of British actors
List of people from Enfield
List of theatre directors

References

External links
 (listed as "Julie N McKenzie" as a result of a previous Broadway actress called "Julia McKenzie")

1941 births
Living people
Actresses from London
Alumni of the Guildhall School of Music and Drama
English film actresses
English musical theatre actresses
English radio actresses
English television actresses
English theatre directors
English theatre managers and producers
Women theatre managers and producers
Laurence Olivier Award winners
People from Enfield, London
Singers from London
Audiobook narrators
English stage actresses
Commanders of the Order of the British Empire
20th-century English actresses
20th-century English women singers
20th-century English singers
21st-century English actresses
21st-century English women singers
21st-century English singers